Justice Faqir Muhammad Khokhar (born April 16, 1945) is a former judge of the Supreme Court of Pakistan. He was also nominated as a candidate for chairman NAB in 2017. He was also judge of Lahore High Court.

Judicial career
He started off as a lawyer after doing his B.A. /L.L.B. He was elevated to the Lahore High Court on December 10, 1996, and then to the
Supreme Court on January 10, 2002.

Justice Khokhar took oath on PCO 2007. On July 31, 2009 Supreme Court held that PCO was illegal and decided to refer the cases of all judges of higher judiciary who took oath on PCO to Supreme Judicial Council. On August 5, 2009 Justice Khokhar resigned from the Supreme Court of Pakistan. His normal tenure would have ended on April 15, 2010 when he would have turned 65.His son Tahir Mahmood Khokhar is also Advocate and remained Law officer in the Attorney General Office as Assistant Attorney General for Pakistan.

Controversies

PCO Oath 2007
He was one of the four Supreme Court judges from a total of 17, who took oath under the provisional constitution on November 3, 2007, despite a ruling by a 7-member bench regarding the suspension of constitution illegal. The other judges who took chose to take oath on PCO on November 3, 2007 were Abdul Hameed Dogar, Muhammad Nawaz Abbasi and M. Javed Buttar.

On July 31, 2009 a 14 panel court of Supreme Court held that PCO was illegal and decided to refer the cases of all justices of higher judiciary to Supreme Judicial Council for further action. Justice Khokhar resigned before his cases was heard before Supreme Judicial Council.

References

Pakistani judges
1945 births
Living people
Justices of the Supreme Court of Pakistan